Kristen Kyrre Bremer (12 July 1925 – 16 May 2013) was a Norwegian theologian and bishop in the Church of Norway.

Education and career
Bremer was born in Tana, Norway in 1925. Bremer received his cand.theol. degree in 1953 in the Faculty of Theology at the University of Oslo. He was ordained as a priest in 1953.  His began his ministry as a Military Chaplain for the brigade in northern Norway from 1953 to 1956.  He then was the assistant pastor at Nord-Fron from 1956 to 1960, a military chaplain in Gaza from 1960–1965.  He served as vicar at Bardu Church from 1965–1969, dean of Senja prosti from 1969–1972, bishop of the Diocese of Nord-Hålogaland from 1972–1979, and bishop of the Diocese of Nidaros from 1979 until his retirement in 1991.

References

1925 births
2013 deaths
People from Tana, Norway
Bishops of Nidaros
20th-century Lutheran bishops
Norwegian military chaplains
Norwegian Army chaplains